Here's the Deal is an album by Liquid Soul, released in 2000. It was nominated for a Grammy Award.

Track listing
 "Sure Fire One" – 	4:27
 "The Diz" – 	3:17
 "Stop By Monie's" – 	3:54
 "Everybody's Got One" – 	3:55
 "Show Me" – 	2:53
 "Sex Tablet" – 	3:22
 "All Blues" – 	6:13
 "Sweet Pea" – 	3:44
 "Donkey Punch" – 	3:41
 "Dysfunction" – 	4:46
 "Rocket Scientist" – 	2:07
 "Spam Sucker" – 	3:22

Personnel
Ajax  – Turntables	
Chris "Hambone" Cameron – Keyboards	
Newt Cole - Percussion
Dirty MF - Rap (Track 5)
Ron Haynes – Trumpet, Flugelhorn	
John Janowiak – Trombone	
Dan Leali – Bass, Drums
Brian "MCB" Quarles - Rap (Track 1)
Tommy Sanchez – Guitar
Ricky Showalter – Bass
Simone - Vocals (Tracks 3 & 10)
Mars Williams – Alto, Soprano, Sax (Alto), Sax (Soprano), Sax (Tenor), Flute (Wood), Tenor (Vocal), Sax (Sopranino), Toy Instruments, Wood Flute

Production
Rick Barnes – Engineer, Mixing
Chris Bauer – Assistant
Jeff Hillman – Mastering
Mike Park – Mixing
Slavic Livins – Mixing
Timothy Powell – Engineer, Live Recording
Brent Smith – Book
Michael Ways – Assistant
David Yow – Design

References

2000 albums
Liquid Soul albums
Shanachie Records albums